Semiaphis is a genus of true bugs belonging to the family Aphididae.

The species of this genus are found in Europe.

Species:
 Semiaphis aizenbergi (Narzikulov, 1957) 
 Semiaphis anthrisci (Kaltenbach, 1843)

References

Aphididae